Gravelines Sportica is an indoor sporting arena located in Gravelines, France. The capacity of the arena is 3,500 people. It is currently home to the Basket Club Maritime Gravelines Dunkerque Grand Littoral basketball team.

Basketball venues in France
Indoor arenas in France
Sports venues in Nord (French department)